Yogi Aaron is a Canadian yoga teacher and author of the book Autobiography of a Naked Yogi. Under the name Aaron Star he founded the Naked Yoga movement in New York City, which incorporates elements of both partner and tantric yoga and is performed while being nude.

Early life and career 
At 18, Star began working out at a Vancouver community center. He became a student of yoga in 1991 and a teacher in 1997. He travelled across the world visiting numerous yoga ashrams and retreat centers, studying with yoga teachers including Bryan Kest, Rod Stryker, Swami Rama, as well as with other spiritual masters in the Himalayas.
 
Star arrived in Manhattan in 2001 and within a short time was offering retreats in different countries. It was during a retreat in Hawaii that Star and his longtime student, Adam, first discussed creating "a community that is yoga-based… and where people can heal their spirits." Six years later, they purchased property in Costa Rica and formed what is today known as Blue Osa.

Star popularized the idea of practicing Hot Nude Yoga which garnered a large following of men in the gay community of New York. Since then it has spread out in Chicago, Los Angeles and Boston. He started the Hot Nude Yoga movement in Chelsea, New York in 2001 in the building on the Southwest corner of 23rd Street and Sixth Avenue.

Star speaks on various topics, most commonly on freedom of oneself and how to be free along with being comfortable with oneself. Fulfillment of life’s purpose is another common topic he speaks and writes about.

Autobiography of a Naked Yogi 
Star wrote Autobiography of a Naked Yogi in 2015. In it, he details how an upbringing in 70’s British Columbia, Canada along with a confrontational childhood and a brutal boarding school education set him on an altogether different trajectory. However instilled with determination and a love for the great outdoors he strove to understand himself in landscapes. Reviewing the book, BroadwayWorld wrote that "Yogi Aaron's narrative is one of empowerment, imbued with a sense of adventure."

Criticism 
Star’s Hot Nude Yoga classes received criticism for its heightened sensuality. The book Yoga in the Modern World: Contemporary Perspectives calls Hot Nude Yoga "A promotion of sexual expression that would have scandalized the likes of Swami Sivananda", while it was also defined as "soft-core pornography" by Stewart J Lawrence in The Guardian. Joshua Stein, editor  for OUT Magazine, who has attended the class wrote that the quality of yoga was diminished by heightened sensuality and according to The Associated Press, Hot Nude Yoga seems to be a "form of sensualized tantric yoga practiced nude."

References

Yoga teachers
1972 births
Living people